Urothemis edwardsii, or blue basker is a species of dragonfly in the family Libellulidae. It is found in Algeria, Angola, Benin, Botswana, Burkina Faso, Cameroon, Chad, the Democratic Republic of the Congo, Ivory Coast, Egypt, Gambia, Ghana, Guinea, Kenya, Liberia, Malawi, Mali, Mauritania, Mozambique, Namibia, Niger, Nigeria, Senegal, Sierra Leone, Somalia, South Africa, Sudan, Tanzania, Uganda, Zambia, Zimbabwe, and possibly Burundi. Its natural habitats are freshwater lakes, intermittent freshwater lakes, freshwater marshes, and intermittent freshwater marshes.

References

Libellulidae
Taxonomy articles created by Polbot
Insects described in 1849